The Transcendental Argument for the Existence of God (TAG) is the argument that attempts to prove the existence of God by arguing that logic, morals, and science ultimately presuppose a supreme being and that God must therefore be the source of logic and morals.

A version was formulated by Immanuel Kant in his 1763 work The Only Possible Argument in Support of a Demonstration of the Existence of God, and most contemporary formulations of the transcendental argument have been developed within the framework of Christian presuppositional apologetics.

Transcendental reasoning
Transcendental arguments should not be confused with arguments for the existence of something transcendent. In other words, they are distinct from both arguments that appeal to a transcendent intuition or sense as evidence, and classical apologetics arguments that move from direct evidence to the existence of a transcendent thing.

They are also sometimes said to be distinct from standard deductive and inductive forms of reasoning, although this has been disputed, for instance by Anthony Genova
 and Graham Bird.

Ash'ari

Medieval Ash'ari Islamic theologians formulated a type of transcendental argument based on the notion that morality, logic, etc. cannot be fully understood apart from revelation and thereby, belief in the Quran and the Islamic truth claims were necessary in order to interpret the external world. For al-Ashari and others, it does not make sense to argue against religion using a priori assumptions about morality or scientific probabilities when these can only be understood in light of divine revelation.

The argument
The TAG is a transcendental argument that attempts to prove that God is the precondition for logic, reason, or morality. The argument proceeds as follows:
 God is a necessary precondition for logic and morality (because these are immaterial, yet real universals).
 People depend upon logic and morality, showing that they depend upon the universal, immaterial, and abstract realities which could not exist in a materialist universe but presupposes (presumes) the existence of an immaterial and absolute God. 
 Therefore, God exists. If He didn't, we could not rely upon logic, reason, morality, and other absolute universals (which are required and assumed to live in this universe, let alone to debate), and could not exist in a materialist universe where there are no absolute standards or an absolute Lawgiver.

Cornelius Van Til likewise wrote:

Therefore, the TAG differs from thomistic and evidentialist arguments, which posit the existence of God in order to avoid an infinite regress of causes or motions.

Reception
Some reject the validity of the argument pointing out various flaws, such as a category error involved in the first premise of the argument, namely that just because there is a statement that is universally true it will not make that statement a part of reality in itself. Another issue pointed out is that it is not needed to have a god to have logic or morality. In particular the existence of multiple logic systems with differing axioms such as non-classical logic as well as multiple radically different moral systems constitutes evidence against the idea that logic and morality are actually universals. Furthermore, the existence of theorems like Gödel's completeness theorem and the soundness theorems for classical logic provide justification for some logic systems like classical propositional logic without using any god hypotheses thus contradicting the first premise of the argument.  It is worth noting however that Gödel also produced a classical propositional proof of god in Gödel's ontological proof.

See also
Christian apologetics
Argument from morality (some forms of which are TAGs)

References

Notes

E. R. Geehan, ed., Jerusalem and Athens: Critical Discussions on the Philosophy and Apologetics of Cornelius Van Til (Phillipsburg: Presbyterian and Reformed, 1980).
Greg L. Bahnsen, Van Til's Apologetic: Readings and Analysis (Phillipsburg: Presbyterian and Reformed, 1998).
John M. Frame, Cornelius Van Til: An Analysis of His Thought (Phillipsburg: Presbyterian and Reformed, 1995).
Steven M. Schlissel, ed., The Standard Bearer: A Festschrift for Greg L. Bahnsen (Nacogdoches: Covenant Media Press, 2002).
Greg L. Bahnsen, Always Ready: Directions for Defending the Faith". Robert R. Booth, ed. (Nacogdoches: Covenant Media Press, 1996).
John M. Frame, Apologetics to the Glory of God: An Introduction (Phillipsburg: Presbyterian and Reformed, 1994).
John M. Frame, The Doctrine of the Knowledge of God (Phillipsburg: Presbyterian and Reformed, 1987).

External links

Articles
Responses to Atheist Philosopher, Michael Martin
Derrida, Van Til and the Metaphysics of Postmodernism An appraisal of Postmodernism, specifically Deconstruction, in light of Van Til by Jacob Gabriel Hale.
The Transcendental Argument for the Existence of God by Matt Slick.

Debates
 "The Great Debate: Does God Exist?" Audio (listen/download format) of a formal debate between Christian Greg Bahnsen and skeptic Gordon Stein from the University of California, Irvine.
 The Martin-Frame Debate A written debate between skeptic Michael Martin and Christian John Frame about the transcendental argument for the existence of God.
 The Drange-Wilson Debate A written debate between skeptic Theodore Drange and Christian Douglas Wilson.
 "Is Non-Christian Thought Futile?" A written debate between Christian Doug Jones and skeptics Keith Parsons and Michael Martin in Antithesis'' magazine (vol. 2, no. 4).

Christian philosophy
Arguments for the existence of God